Neker may be:
an Old Swedish name for the nix water spirits
a Limburgish name for the river Jeker

See also 
 Necker (disambiguation)